Revival is the debut studio album by Vancouver Sleep Clinic. It was released on 7 April 2017 through Columbia Records. It features production work primarily from Al Shux, who has previously worked with Banks, Birdy and Shura.

Track listing

Critical reception 
Writing for the fan-based blog Carnesa, Benjamin Solomon states, "The album is a moody record, and the eerie nature of his voice makes for a chilling collection of acoustic pieces perfectly collated to tell a story almost incomprehensible due to his ghostly vocals, but very relatable... [the album] is sorrowfully sombre, yet is a fine anesthetizer to the more up-beat and violent waves rocking the radio today," stating tracks Empire, Wildfire and Revival as album highlights. He also praises Tim Bettinson's vocal performance, noting that it is "transcendent from start to finish, although it particularly is powerful on Someone to Stay."

References

2017 debut albums
Vancouver Sleep Clinic albums
Sony Music albums
Albums produced by Al Shux